Melissa Jackson is the former head coach of the University of Akron women's basketball team.

Career
She was an assistant to Akron head coach Jodi Kest for ten years before being promoted to head coach in June 2018. Prior to Akron she was an assistant coach at Delaware.  She played basketball at Richmond. She led Akron to a 2022 Women's National Invitation Tournament appearance.
During her fifth season, Akron announced on February 21, 2023 that Jackson's contract will not be renewed at the end of the season, ending her 5-year tenure.

Personal life
While at the Eastern Michigan she earned a bachelor's degree in political science degree in 2004. She and her husband Drew have two sons, Luke and Ben.

Head coaching record

References

External links
Akron Zips coaching bio

Living people
Year of birth missing (living people)
Place of birth missing (living people)
Akron Zips women's basketball coaches
American women's basketball coaches
Richmond Spiders women's basketball players